Macrobrochis infernalis is a moth of the family Erebidae. It was described by Walter Karl Johann Roepke in 1938. It is found on Sulawesi in Indonesia.

References

Lithosiina
Moths described in 1938